Professor Kenji Takagi (1888–1963) was a Japanese orthopedic surgeon, noted for being the first to carry out a successful arthroscopy of the knee.

Takagi was attached to Tokyo University (where he succeeded Yoshinori Tashiro) in 1918 when he carried out the ground-breaking operation on a cadaver.  He had been influenced by the work of Danish surgeon Severin Nordentoft.  In 1922, he went to Germany to study the use of x-ray technology there.  Following World War II, Takagi's pupil Masaki Watanabe, carried on his work.

References

1888 births
1963 deaths
Japanese orthopedic surgeons
20th-century surgeons